is a former Japanese cyclist. He competed in the men's tandem at the 1964 Summer Olympics. From 1967 to 1996 he was a professional keirin cyclist, with a total of 24 championships and 440 wins in his career. He served as a coach for the national cycling team at the 2004 Summer Olympics as well as the head coach for the national cycling team at the 2008 Paralympic Games.

References

1944 births
Living people
Japanese male cyclists
Olympic cyclists of Japan
Cyclists at the 1964 Summer Olympics
Keirin cyclists